Nogodinidae is a family of planthoppers. They have membranous wings with delicate venation and can be confused with members of other Fulgoroid families such as the Issidae and Tropiduchidae. Some authors treat it as a subfamily of the Issidae. Some of their key features are a frons ("face") that is longer than wide and a reticulate wing venation. They are less than 2 cm long. The antenna arises well below the eye, has the base clubbed and  flagellum unsegmented. The lateral ocelli (simple eyes) are outside the margins of the face. The face has carinae (or keels) on the edge. On the hind leg, the second tarsal segment has an apical spine arising from it. The tibia of the hind leg also has spines towards the tip. An important family character is found in the shape of the male genital structure, a style that is longer than broad. Most members of this family are forest species.

Several fossil species have been described from Eocene Baltic and Miocene Chiapas amber. Additionally, a tribe, Celinapterixini, has been erected on the basis of an Argentinian fossil that could not be placed in any of the tribes of extant Nogodinid hoppers.

References

External links
 

 
Auchenorrhyncha families
Fulgoromorpha